Sonia Maria Fleury Teixeira also simply known as Sonia Fleury is a Brazilian political scientist, researcher and professor. She has written and published over 120 research articles in scientific magazines and editorials.

Career 
Sonia holds a doctorate degree in political science, bachelor's degree in psychology and also pursued her master's degree in sociology. She has been a faculty fellow at the Kellogg Institute at the University of Notre Dame in USA.

She has served as a prominent researcher at the Oswaldo Cruz Foundation in Brazil and also served as a professor at the National School of Public Health in Brazil until 1995. In addition, she has also worked as a consultant for Brazilian social ministries, IDB, UNDP, World Bank, WHO, SELA and CLAD.

She currently serves as a senior researcher at the Escola Brasileira de Administração Pública e de Empresas, Fundação Getulio Vargas. Sonia has also been often critical about Brazilian government's mishandling of the COVID-19 pandemic in Brazil.

References

External links 

Living people
20th-century Brazilian women
20th-century Brazilian scientists
21st-century Brazilian women
21st-century Brazilian scientists
Brazilian women academics
Brazilian educators
Brazilian women scientists
Brazilian women writers
Brazilian political scientists
University of Notre Dame faculty
Year of birth missing (living people)